Nickrenz may refer to:
 Erika Nickrenz, an American classical pianist best known as the pianist for the Eroica Trio
 Joanna Nickrenz, a producer, Best Chamber Music Performance at the 44th Grammy Awards